Karletta Chief is a Diné hydrologist, best known for her work to address environmental pollution on the Navajo Nation and increase the participation of Native Americans in STEM.

Education 
Chief earned her B.S. and M.S. in civil and environmental engineering at Stanford University. She completed her PhD in hydrology and water resources at the University of Arizona in 2007, where she is now a faculty member.

Career 
One of Chief's research interests is addressing food, energy and water challenges in Indigenous communities with methods that include their traditional values. In particular, she has researched the impacts of the 2015 Gold King Mine spill on residents of the Navajo Nation. Her research regarding the effects of the Gold King spill have aided several communities affected by the disaster. As part of this work, Chief gives public presentations in the Navajo language, especially to farmers, ranchers, and families who are affected by pollution and mining waste. She has said that her scientific research and her identity are closely linked, telling Science Friday, “my identity is water-based [from the Bitter Water Clan]. And so that motivates me to do the work that I do.”

Chief was featured in a short film produced by Science Friday in 2018.

Selected awards and honors 

 Most Promising Engineer/Scientist, American Indian Science and Engineering Society (AISES), 2011
 Distinguished Alumni Scholar, Stanford University, 2013
 Native American 40 Under 40, National Center for American Indian Enterprise Development, 2015
 Professional of the Year, AISES, 2016
 Woman of the Year, Phoenix Indian Center, 2016
 Featured Speaker, Society for the Advancement of Chicanos/Native Americans in STEM (SACNAS), 2019
 Ambassador Award (2020)

Selected publications 

 Chief, K., R. E. Emanuel, and O. Conroy-Ben (2019), Indigenous symposium on water research, education, and engagement, Eos, 100, https://doi.org/10.1029/2019EO114313. Published on 24 January 2019.

References 

21st-century Native Americans
American women scientists
Hydrologists
Native American women academics
American women academics
Native American academics
Navajo scientists
Stanford University School of Engineering alumni
Year of birth missing (living people)
Living people
21st-century Native American women
Native American women scientists
Women hydrologists